List of rivers of Washington may refer to:

 List of rivers of Washington (state)
 List of rivers of Washington, D.C.